Mussa Bin Bique, other names Musa Al Big or Mossa Al Bique or Mussa Ben Mbiki or Mussa Ibn Malik, was ruler of the Island of Mozambique and wealthy merchant, before the Portuguese took over the island in 1544.

Background
Islam in Mozambique has a history that goes back to at least the tenth century. The records show that the region was known and well frequented by Muslim travelers and traders. Mussa Bin Bique was considered to be a shaykh, i.e a person with authority in Islamic knowledge. The name of the island, and subsequently the entire African nation of Mozambique, was derived from his name. With Islam came the literacy into this land in the fields of poetry, history, commercial transactions, and other literary genres. By the middle of the fifteenth century, permanent and flourishing commercial and religious sultanates had been established along the coast and some had penetrated up the Zambezi.

Legacy
As colonial history is erased from many landmarks and regional names, there is a university in Maputo bearing the name of Mozambique's ruler Mussa Bin Bique from five hundred years back called "Mussa Bin Bique University", established in 1998.

References

History of Mozambique
15th-century Arabs
Arab politicians
African people of Arab descent